The Greater Martinique skink (Mabuya mabouya) is a species of skink found on Martinique.  It has shiny, bronze-colored skin, with a pair of light stripes that run along its upper flanks.

It was previously thought to be widespread throughout the Neotropics, but a taxonomic revision in 2005 established it as endemic to Martinique. With its new, restricted distribution, it is feared to be possibly extinct.

References

Mabouya
Lizards of the Caribbean
Reptiles described in 1789
Taxa named by Pierre Joseph Bonnaterre